Livensky District is an administrative and municipal district (raion), one of the twenty-four in Oryol Oblast, Russia. It is located in the southwest of the oblast. Its administrative center is the town of Livny (which is not administratively a part of the district). Population: 32,791 (2010 Census);

Administrative and municipal status
Within the framework of administrative divisions, Livensky District is one of the twenty-four in the oblast. The town of Livny serves as its administrative center, despite being incorporated separately as a town of oblast significance—an administrative unit with the status equal to that of the districts.

As a municipal division, the district is incorporated as Livensky Municipal District. The town of oblast significance of Livny is incorporated separately from the district as Livny Urban Okrug.

Notable people
 Nikolai Nikolaevich Polikarpov (1892–1944), Soviet and Russian aeronautical engineer and aircraft designer
 Alexey Stakhanov (1906–1977), Soviet and Russian miner of Donets basin, propaganda celebrity of Stakhanovite movement

References

Notes

Sources

Districts of Oryol Oblast
